Owen Equipment & Erection Co. v. Kroger, 437 U.S. 365 (1978), is a case that was decided by the United States Supreme Court regarding the civil procedure subject of ancillary jurisdiction.

Facts 
Respondent Kroger, a citizen of Iowa, filed suit against the Omaha Public Power District (OPPD), a Nebraska utility company.  Her suit was to recover damages for the wrongful death of her husband, who was electrocuted while walking next to a crane whose boom came too close to a power line.  OPPD, which owned the power line, filed a third-party complaint against Owen Equipment & Erection Co., which owned and operated the crane.  Kroger then amended her complaint to name Owen as an additional defendant.  While Owen initially stated that it was a Nebraska corporation, it was later found that Owen's principal place of business was in fact in Iowa, thus destroying the diversity of citizenship required for jurisdiction under .

Procedure 
When confronted with a motion to dismiss for lack of complete diversity, the United States District Court for the District of Nebraska reserved ruling until the end of the trial. Following a jury verdict in favor of the plaintiff, the federal district court in an unreported decision denied the motion to dismiss on diversity grounds. The Court of Appeals for the Eighth Circuit affirmed the lower court's decision, and the Supreme Court granted certiorari.

Issue 
Whether a court can hear a plaintiff's claim against a third-party defendant when there is no independent basis for federal jurisdiction over that claim in an action in which federal jurisdiction is based on diversity of citizenship, a circumstance called ancillary jurisdiction.

Holding 
Whereas the Eighth Circuit relied on United Mine Workers of America v. Gibbs, the Supreme Court in its 7 to 2 majority decision written by Justice Potter Stewart limited Gibbs to pendent jurisdiction, bringing state claims in addition to a federal claim.  The Court set forth two limits on ancillary jurisdiction beyond the "common nucleus of operative fact" of Gibbs.  First, the non-federal claim must be "ancillary and dependent" on the original claim rather than "new and independent", and second, courts can be more lenient to defendants than to plaintiffs because plaintiffs choose where the claims will be brought.  In this instance, Kroger was a plaintiff who had chosen federal court and the claim against Owen was "entirely separate" from her original claim against OPPD "since [Owen's] liability to her depended not at all upon whether or not OPPD was also liable."  Thus, the court generally upheld the complete diversity requirement of (a)(1) but allowed certain limited exceptions for ancillary jurisdiction.  Kroger, however, did not meet those exceptions.

Dissent 
Justice White dissented, stating that the majority overlooked such factors as convenience, judicial economy, and considerations of fairness in order to rigidly uphold legislation.

Subsequent History 
The majority's holding on ancillary jurisdiction was subsequently codified by Congress in (b) as part of its supplemental jurisdiction statute.

Carter Lake 
The Court noted that geography had caused the issue. Owen was based in Carter Lake, Iowa, which is west of the Missouri River. Although the Missouri River generally is the boundary between Iowa and Nebraska, the river in 1877 had avulsed one of its bends, cutting off the land that later became the city of Carter Lake on the western side. The Supreme Court six years earlier had mentioned the circumstances of Carter Lake when it ruled on a boundary dispute between the two states in Nebraska v. Iowa, 406 U.S. 117 (1972).

See also
List of United States Supreme Court cases, volume 437

References

External links
 

United States ancillary jurisdiction case law
United States Supreme Court cases
United States Supreme Court cases of the Burger Court
1978 in United States case law